is a town located in Sera District, Hiroshima Prefecture, Japan.

On October 1, 2004, the towns of Kōzan and Seranishi, both from Sera District, were merged into the expanded town of Sera.

As of the merger but with 2003 population data, the town has an estimated population of 19,213 and a density of 69.04 persons per km². The total (expanded) area is 278.29 km².

After the merger, the former Sera Town Hall officially closed down and the new town hall is now located in the former town of Kōzan.

Geography

Climate
Sera has a humid subtropical climate (Köppen climate classification Cfa) characterized by cool to mild winters and hot, humid summers.

Demographics
Per Japanese census data, the population of Sera in 2020 is 15,125 people. Sera has been conducting censuses since 1960.

References

External links

Sera official website 

Towns in Hiroshima Prefecture